Mysterious Mr. Parkes (French title: L'Énigmatique Monsieur Parkes) is a 1930 American Pre-Code comedy drama film made by Paramount Pictures, directed by Louis J. Gasnier.  It was a French-language version of Slightly Scarlet for the European market.

Cast
Adolphe Menjou as Courtenay Parkes
Claudette Colbert as Lucy Stavrin
Emile Chautard as Sylvester Corbett
Adrienne D'Ambricourt as Mrs. Corbett
Sandra Ravel as Edith Corbett
Armand Kaliz as Malatroff
André Cheron as Police Captain

References

External links
 
 
 

1930 films
American black-and-white films
1930 comedy-drama films
Films directed by Louis J. Gasnier
Paramount Pictures films
American comedy-drama films
American multilingual films
1930 multilingual films
1930s French-language films
1930s American films